Stephen 'Steve' Gregory (born 1945) is an English jazz saxophonist and composer.  He plays tenor, alto, soprano and baritone saxophone as well as the flute.

Biography and career
Gregory was born in London. At St. Paul's School he learned guitar and piano and played clarinet in the school orchestra. He turned down a place at the prestigious Guildhall School of Music and Drama to become a professional musician. Soon he was playing with The Alan Price Set and was in demand for session work, playing for people like Screamin' Jay Hawkins, Fleetwood Mac and others. Alongside Bud Beadle he provided the saxophone for the 1969 hit "Honky Tonk Women" by The Rolling Stones. He also played with Georgie Fame and Geno Washington.

Gregory began to branch out, continuing to play with Georgie Fame but also recording and playing with bands like Ginger Baker's Air Force, Gonzalez, Linda Lewis, Boney M.  and Rocky Sharpe and the Replays. Gregory also played saxophone on Andy Fairweather Low's 1975 album, La Booga Rooga. He also spent some time in Nigeria, playing with Fela Kuti at his Afrika Shrine.

In the 1980s, Gregory decided to go freelance. He took on television work and continued with session work. He played the saxophone on George Michael's hit "Careless Whisper". Gregory also worked with artists such as Bryn Haworth, Chris Rea, Alison Moyet, Freddie King, Maxi Priest, China Crisis, Queen (played solo on "One Year of Love")  and Amazulu. He also was member of the 1983/84 world reunion tour of The Animals.

In the 1990s, Gregory played with Wet Wet Wet, Van Morrison, and then joined the Dennis Bovell Dub Band, touring around the world with Linton Kwesi Johnson. He released his first solo album, an acid/jazz/fusion set, Bushfire, on LKJ Records featuring Georgie Fame and John Deacon from Queen.

Gregory occasionally performs with the jazz band Pastiche.

Discography
Bushfire (1994), LKJ Records (LKJ CD 011)

References

1945 births
Living people
English jazz saxophonists
British male saxophonists
English jazz flautists
English jazz composers
Male jazz composers
English male composers
People educated at St Paul's School, London
English session musicians
21st-century saxophonists
21st-century British male musicians
Gonzalez (band) members
21st-century flautists